A national military formation refers to a regiment/division in the Soviet Red Army of the Soviet Union, formed before and during the Second World War on the basis of nationalities of the personnel in their ranks. In addition to national units, representatives of all nationalities served in ordinary military formations not divided according to national or other grounds.

Historical summary 
In its first days of its existence, the Red Army had a tradition of forming national military units (which continued the trends that existed before the revolution), either openly (a unit with a "national" name was created, staffed mainly by representatives of the same nationality), or by the "concentration" method, in which conscripts of the same nationality were sent to one compound. Many similar units in the former Imperial Russian Army had existed for years, with many national Bolshevik military units taking part in the October Revolution of 1917. During the Russian Civil War, national units had what was considered to be an impressive battle record. It was the brainchild of Mikhail Frunze, who made sure that national formations were of different sizes, ranging from platoons to divisions. For the training of military personnel of these units, special educational institutions were created. As a rule, national formations served in the areas where they were formed. The existence of units like these were controversial in the Soviet leadership, who believed that they couldn't be able to control them.

The proportion of soldiers of the Red Army serving in national military units has always been small. At the beginning of 1938, less than 2% of the Red Army served in national formations. In 1934, the Belarusian and Ukrainian national units were disbanded and in 1938, a special decree of the Central Committee of the Bolshevik Party and the Council of People's Commissars "On National Units and Formations of the Red Army", abolished all national formations and introduced a unified national procedure for military service for representatives of the country's ethnic communities. The outbreak of the Second World War a year later and the Great Patriotic War two years after that forced the Soviet government to reverse this decision. The reformation of the national units resumed in August 1941 by order of the State Defense Committee, two months after the start of Operation Barbarossa. This was meant to be a counter to the collaborationist formations composed of Soviet nationals on in occupied parts of the USSR (such as the Kaminski Brigade, the Armenian Legion, and the Turkestan Legion). The first formation ever raised was the 201st Latvian Rifle Division, with 90% of its personnel being residents of the Latvian SSR and more than half consisting of ethnic Latvians. Many national formations lost their nationality specification after the war, continuing to exist in numbers until the 1950s.

List of units

Azerbaijan SSR
27th Mountain Division
77th Mountain Rifle Division named for Sergo Ordzhonikidze
151st Infantry Division
217th Infantry Division
223rd Infantry Division
227th Infantry Division
271st Rifle Division
396th Infantry Division
402nd Rifle Division
416th Rifle Division

Armenian SSR
390th Rifle Division
408th Rifle Division
409th Rifle Division
89th Rifle Division
76th Rifle Division
201st Rifle Division
17th Mountain Rifle Division

Bashkir ASSR 

 16th Guards Cavalry Division
 113th Cavalry Division

Buryat-Mongolian and Yakut ASSR 

 321st Infantry Division

Chechen-Ingush ASSR 

 114th Cavalry Division

Estonian SSR
8th Estonian Rifle Corps
7th Rifle Division
249th Estonian Rifle Division

Georgian SSR 

 9th Mountain Rifle Division 
 47th Mountain Rifle Division "Comrade Stalin"
 63rd Mountain Rifle Division "Mikhail Frunze"
 276th Red Banner Rifle Division
 296th Rifle Division
 349th Rifle Division
 392nd Rifle Division
 406th Rifle Division
 414th Rifle Division

Kabardino-Balkarian ASSR 

 115th Cavalry Division

Kalmyk ASSR
110th Cavalry Division
111th Cavalry Division

Kazakh SSR 
 100th Kazakh Rifle Brigade
 101st Separate Rifle Brigade
 102nd Separate Rifle Brigade
 151st Separate Rifle Brigade
 105th Cavalry Division
 106th Cavalry Division
 196th Infantry Division

Kirghiz SSR 
 107th Cavalry Division
 108th Cavalry Division
 109th Cavalry Division

Latvian SSR

 76th Latvian Special Rifle Regiment
 1st Latvian Night Light Bomber Aviation Regiment
 201st Latvian Rifle Division
43rd Guards Rifle Division
308th Latvian Infantry Division
130th Rifle Corps

Lithuanian SSR
16th Rifle Division
50th Reserve Rifle Division

Moldovan SSR
14th Assault Engineering and Combat Brigade
507th Army Anti-Tank Kishinev Artillery Regiment
95th Rifle Division, First Formation. Formed 1927, "Moldovan" designation given c. 16 January 1934. See :ru:95-я стрелковая дивизия (1-го формирования).

Tajik SSR 
 17th Guards Cavalry Division (founded as the 20th Tajik Mountain Cavalry Division)
 98th Rifle Brigade
 99th Rifle Brigade
 104th Cavalry Division

Turkmen SSR 
 68th Mountain Rifle Division
 18th Cavalry Division
 62nd Turkestan Rifle Division
 72nd Mountain Division
 97th Cavalry Division
 98th Cavalry Division
 87th Separate Rifle Brigade
 88th Separate Rifle Brigade
 128th Guards Mountain Rifle Division

Uzbek SSR 

 19th Cavalry Division
 89th Separate Rifle Brigade
 90th Separate Rifle Brigade
 91st Separate Rifle Brigade
 92nd Separate Rifle Brigade
 93rd Separate Rifle Brigade
 94th Separate Rifle Brigade
 95th Separate Rifle Brigade
 96th Separate Rifle Brigade
 97th Separate Rifle Brigade
 99th Cavalry Division
 100th Cavalry Division
 101st Cavalry Division
 102nd Cavalry Division
 103rd Cavalry Division

Formations for nationalities outside the USSR 

The 88th Separate Rifle Brigade was unique in that it incorporated the peoples of Korea, China and Soviet Central Asia in its ranks. This unit was founded in July 1942 to accommodate the remaining forces of the Northeast Anti-Japanese United Army, who were exiled to the Soviet Union after being driven by the Imperial Japanese Army to Manchuria during the war. Chinese Major General Zhou Baozhong was commander of the brigade. Notable members have included Kim Il-sung, Lim Chum-chu and Kim Chaek.

Notable commanders and members
Kim Il-sung
Feliksas Baltušis-Žemaitis
Hmayak Babayan

Legacy of national formations in the twenty-first century
In a ceremony that preceded the Shushi Liberation Day and Victory Day parade in Yerevan in 2020, the Armenian Honour Guard Company took the combat flags of the six Armenian national divisions out of the Mother Armenia Military History Museum and handed them over to Armenian veterans of the war. Then, the six veterans were driven to the airport, where they handed the banners to the pilots participating in the flypast over the capital.
During the commemorations of the 75th anniversary of the Jassy–Kishinev Offensive in 2019, the center of which was a national ceremony at the Capul de pod Șerpeni Memorial Complex, Russian Defense Minister Sergey Shoigu ceremonially handed to his Moldovan counterpart the military flags of two all-Moldovan regiments who participated in the offensive (including the 14th Assault Engineering and Combat Brigade), which until that point, were kept at the Central Armed Forces Museum.
In Taganrog, on the Sambek Heights, there is a memorial complex known as the Glory Memorial in honor of the 416th Azerbaijani Division, opened in 1980 at the personal initiative of the First Secretary of the Central Committee of the Communist Party of Azerbaijan Heydar Aliyev. It was restored in 2011.

Gallery

See also
Korenizatsiya
National delimitation in the Soviet Union
Wehrmacht foreign volunteers and conscripts
Mixed brigade

References

Army units and formations of the Soviet Union
Lists of Russian and Soviet military units and formations